Missira is a town and sub-prefecture in the Koubia Prefecture in the Labé Region of northern Guinea.

References

Sub-prefectures of the Labé Region